A Newel is the upright post about which the steps of a circular staircase wind.

Newel may also refer to:

 Newel, Germany

People
 Stanford Newel (1839–1907), American attorney and diplomat
 Newel K. Whitney (1795-1850), American convert to Mormonism
 Newel Knight (1800-1847), American convert to Mormonism

See also
 Newell (disambiguation)